The Copa del Rey 2006-07 was the 71st edition of the Spanish basketball Cup. It was organized by the ACB and was disputed in Málaga, Andalusia in the Jose Maria Martin Carpena Arena between days 8 and 11 of February. The winning team was Winterthur FC Barcelona.

Brackett

Quarterfinals

SemiFinals

Final

Copa del Rey MVP: Jordi Trias.

Television Broadcasting
TVE2 and FORTA.

Organizer
ACB and the Ayuntamiento de Málaga.

Sponsorships
Nike, Mahou-San Miguel and Winterthur Group.

External links
2006/2007 Copa del Rey Official Website 
Málaga Tourism Official Website

Copa del Rey de Baloncesto
2006–07 in Spanish basketball cups